is a satellite city located in Fukuoka Prefecture, Japan, about 25 kilometers southeast of Kitakyushu. The city was founded on October 10, 1954.

As of October 1, 2016, the city has a population of 70,601 (according to the city's official home page) and a population density of 1,000 persons per km². The total area is 69.83 km².

History
The hamlet of Maeda in Yukuhashi was the birthplace of Suematsu Kencho.

Geography

Climate
Yukuhashi has a humid subtropical climate (Köppen: Cfa).

Demographics
Per Japanese census data, the population of Yukuhashi in 2020 is 71,426 people. Yukuhashi has been conducting censuses since 1950.

Transportation 
Air
New Kitakyushu Airport

Train
JR Kyushu
Nippo Line
Yukuhashi Station - Minami-Yukuhashi Station - Shindenbaru Station
Heisei Chikuhō Railway
Tagawa Line
Yukuhashi Station - Miyako-Izumi Station - Imagawa-Kappa Station - Toyotsu Station
Coto Coto Train touristic service

Road
Expressways
Higashikyushu Expressway
Yukuhashi Interchange - Imagawa Interchange/Service Area
National highways:
Route 10
Route 201
Route 496

See also
New Kitakyushu Airport

References

External links

 Yukuhashi City official website 

 
Cities in Fukuoka Prefecture